Weird Science was an American science fiction comic book magazine that was part of the EC Comics line in the early 1950s. Over a four-year span, the comic ran for 22 issues, ending with the November–December, 1953 issue. Weird Fantasy was a sister title published during the same time frame.

Publication history 
Published by Bill Gaines and edited by Al Feldstein, the bi-monthly Weird Science replaced Saddle Romances with the May/June 1950 issue. Although the title and format change took effect with issue 12, Gaines and Feldstein decided not to restart the numbering in order to save money on second class postage. The Post Office took note and, starting with issue #5, all the issues were numbered correctly. Because of this, Weird Science #12 could refer to either the May/June 1950 issue, or the actual 12th issue published in 1952. The same confusion exists for issues #13-15, #15 being the last issue published before EC reset the numbering.

Artist/Writer Harry Harrison claims credit for originally giving Gaines the notion of publishing science fiction. Harrison has stated that he and artist Wally Wood were interested in science fiction and gave Gaines science fiction stories to read. Harrison, however, had no editorial control over the contents of the comic aside from his own stories and left EC by the end of 1950.

Artists and writers
Early cover illustrations were by Feldstein. Wood, the title's leading artist, took over as the regular cover illustrator in 1952. For a period of time in 1952, Wood drew two stories per issue. The other Weird Science interior artists were Feldstein, Frank Frazetta, Al Williamson, Joe Orlando, George Evans, Harvey Kurtzman, George Roussos, Harrison, Will Elder, Jack Kamen, Sid Check and Jack Olesen. Writers in the early issues included Feldstein, Gaines, Kurtzman, Harrison and Gardner Fox. Gaines and Feldstein wrote nearly all stories from 1951 to 1953.

Stories and themes
As with other EC Comics, Gaines and Feldstein used some Weird Science stories to teach moral lessons. "The Probers" (#8) features a space shuttle doctor who pays no mind to dissecting various animals, only to end up on an alien planet where aliens plan to dissect him. In "The Worm Turns" (#11) astronauts have fun with Mexican jumping beans but face a similar situation when they hide in a piece of fruit on an alien world and are found by a giant alien. "He Walked Among Us" (#13) was a take on organized religion in which a Christ-like astronaut helps the impoverished populace of an alien world but is killed by those in power, prompting the birth of a religion.

Gaines and Feldstein made cameo appearances in "Chewed Out" (#12), and other EC staffers were drawn into "EC Confidential" (#21).

Influences and adaptations
As with the other EC comics edited by Feldstein, the stories in this comic were primarily based on Gaines reading a large number of science fiction stories and using them to develop "springboards" from which he and Feldstein could launch new stories. Specific story influences that have been identified include the following:

 "Lost in the Microcosm" (issue 12 [1950]) - Henry Hasse's "He Who Shrank"
 "The Micro Race" (issue 13 [1950]) - Theodore Sturgeon's "Microcosmic God"
 "The Sounds from Another World" (issue 14 [1950]) - Roald Dahl's "The Sound Machine"
 "Machine from Nowhere" (issue 14 [1950]) - Maurice Hugi's "Mechanical Mouse"
 "Divide and Conquer" (issue 6) - Donald Wandrei's "A Scientist Divides"
 "Monster from the Fourth Dimension" (issue 7) - Donald Wandrei's "The Monster from Nowhere"
 "The Martian Monster" (issue 9) - Anthony Boucher's "Mr. Lupescu"
 "Why Papa Left Home" (issue 11) - Charles Harness's "Child by Chronos"
 "Chewed Out!" (issue 12) - Katherine MacLean's "Pictures Don't Lie!"
 "Say Your Prayers" (issue 13) - Anthony Boucher's "Expedition"
 "The Island Monster" (issue 17) - Merian C. Cooper and Ernest B. Schoedsack's King Kong
 "Keyed Up!" (issue 19) - Duncan Munro's "U-Turn"

After their unauthorized adaptation of one of Ray Bradbury's stories in another magazine, Bradbury contacted EC about their plagiarism of his work. They reached an agreement for EC to do authorized versions of Bradbury's short fiction.  These official adaptations include:

 "The Long Years" (issue 17)
 "Mars Is Heaven!" (issue 18)
 "The One Who Waits" (issue 19)
 "Surprise Package" (issue 20)
 "Punishment Without Crime" (issue 21)
 "Outcast of the Stars" (issue 22)

Demise
EC's science fiction comics were never able to match the popularity of their horror comics like Tales from the Crypt, but Gaines and Feldstein kept them alive using the profits from their more popular titles. In the EC Library reprints, comics historian Mark Evanier theorizes that the short story format, where no story was longer than eight pages helped contribute to poor sales because the horror comics were much better suited for very short stories with shock endings than the science fiction comics. Evanier also ponders whether the very similar logo style of Weird Science and its companion comic Weird Fantasy as well as similar cover subjects contributed to lower sales due to customers thinking they already owned the issues on sale. Historian Digby Diehl wondered whether having host characters like EC's horror comics would have helped the comics be more commercially successful.

When the poor sales became too much to handle, Weird Science combined with companion comic Weird Fantasy in 1954 to become Weird Science-Fantasy. As discussed in an "In Memoriam" feature in the final issue, it was stated that every issue for the previous year and a half lost money and they had no choice but to combine the two comics into one. Weird Science-Fantasy ran for seven issues before a title change to Incredible Science Fiction for four issues.

Reprints 
As with many other EC titles, Weird Science has been reprinted numerous times over the years. Ballantine Books reprinted selected stories in a series of paperback EC anthologies in 1964-66. All 22 issues were published in black and white in four hardbound volumes in 1980 as part of publisher Russ Cochran's The Complete EC Library. This set was published in two versions, the original, with what Cochran later said were his own incomplete and occasionally erroneous analyses, and a revised version containing analysis from outside contributors. In addition, all 22 issues were reprinted in comic form in the mid-1990s by Cochran and Gemstone Publishing. This complete run was later rebound, with covers included, in a series of five softcover EC Annuals. In 2007, Cochran and Gemstone began to publish hardcover, re-colored volumes of Weird Science as part of the EC Archives series.  Three volumes (of a projected four) were published before Gemstone's financial troubles left the project in limbo.  But the project may soon be revived under a new publisher.  GC Press LLC, a boutique imprint established by Russ Cochran and Grant Geissman, announced in a press release dated September 1, 2011 that it is continuing the EC Archives series, with the first new releases scheduled for November 2011.

Media adaptations
John Hughes' 1985 film has become the most famous bearer of the Weird Science name. Joel Silver, the producer of the film, had acquired film rights to EC Comics in the early 1980s. However, the film has little in common with the comic book series besides sharing the title. A television series aired from 1994 to 1997 following the success of the film.

HBO's Perversions of Science is a science fiction/horror television series based on Weird Science stories. It has been suggested on The Simpsons season 3 DVD commentary for the episode "Treehouse of Horror II" that the appearance of Kang and Kodos was based on cover art from EC Comics. No specific issue number is mentioned, but it may be a combination of different covers including possibly Weird Science #6 and #16.

Issue guide

References

Comics magazines published in the United States
EC Comics publications
Science fiction comics
1950 comics debuts
1953 comics endings
Magazines established in 1950
Magazines disestablished in 1953
American comics adapted into films
Defunct American comics